Glubb is a surname. Notable people with the surname include:

Faris Glubb (1939–2004), British-Jordanian writer, journalist, translator, and publisher
Frederic Manley Glubb (1857–1938), British Army officer
John Bagot Glubb (1897–1986), British soldier, scholar, and author

See also
Grubb